A number of steamships were named Nestor, including –

, 282 GRT
, 122 GRT
, 1,096 GRT
, 14,629 GRT
, 1,959 GRT
, 153 GRT
, 2,446 GRT

Ship names